Goshen County School District #1 is a public school district based in Torrington, Wyoming, United States.

History

Ryan Kramer, previously superintendent of West Sioux Community School District in Iowa, became superintendent of the Goshen County No. 1 district as of July 1, 2019. He had visited the county before accepting his position.

Geography
Goshen County School District #1 is the only school district based in Goshen County. It serves most of Goshen County and also extends into a small portion of southeastern Platte County. The following communities are served by the district:

Incorporated places
Town of Fort Laramie
Town of LaGrange
Town of Lingle
City of Torrington
Town of Yoder
Census-designated places (Note: All census-designated places are unincorporated.)
Hawk Springs
Huntley
Veteran
Unincorporated places
Jay Em

Schools

High school
Grades 9-12
Torrington High School

Middle school
Grades 6-8
Torrington Middle School

Elementary schools
Grades 3-5
Trail Elementary School
Grades K-2
Lincoln Elementary School
Grades K-6
La Grange Elementary School

K-12 Schools
Lingle-Fort Laramie School
High School (9-12)
Middle School (6-8)
Elementary School (K-5)
Southeast School - Yoder, WY
High School (9-12)
Junior High School (7-8)
Elementary School (K-6)

Student demographics
The following figures are as of October 1, 2008.

Total District Enrollment: 1,816
Student enrollment by gender
Male: 932 (51.32%)
Female: 884 (48.68%)
Student enrollment by ethnicity
White (not Hispanic): 1,510 (83.10%)
Hispanic: 268 (14.76%)
American Indian or Alaskan Native: 26 (1.43%)
Black (not Hispanic): 9 (0.50%)
Asian or Pacific Islander: 3 (0.17%)

See also
List of school districts in Wyoming

References

External links
Goshen County School District #1 – official site.

School districts in Wyoming
Education in Goshen County, Wyoming
Education in Platte County, Wyoming
Torrington, Wyoming